Cristian Leric (born June 27, 1974 in Arad, Romania) is a retired Romanian artistic gymnast whose best event was the vault. He is a world bronze medalist with the team and a two-time continental medalist on vault. After retirement he performed in  the Aeros entertainment show.

References

1974 births
Living people
Romanian male artistic gymnasts
Gymnasts at the 1996 Summer Olympics
Olympic gymnasts of Romania
Medalists at the World Artistic Gymnastics Championships
Sportspeople from Arad, Romania